The 1985 IAAF Grand Prix Final was the first edition of the season-ending competition for track and field,  organised by the International Association of Athletics Federations. It was held at the Stadio Olimpico in Rome, Italy on 7 September 1985. Americans Doug Padilla (5000 metres) and Mary Slaney (3000 metres) were the overall points winners of the tournament.

Medal summary

Men

Women

Points leaders

Men

Women

References
IAAF Grand Prix Final. GBR Athletics. Retrieved 11 September 2013.

External links
IAAF Grand Prix Final archive from IAAF

Grand Prix Final
Grand Prix Final
International athletics competitions hosted by Italy
1985
1980s in Rome
IAAF World Final
Sports competitions in Rome
Athletics in Rome